The 2013 Wimbledon Championships are described below in detail, in the form of day-by-day summaries.

Day-by-day summaries

Day 1 (24 June)
 Seeds out:
 Gentlemen's Singles:  Rafael Nadal [5],  Stan Wawrinka [11],  Janko Tipsarević [14],  Fabio Fognini [30]
 Ladies' Singles:  Sara Errani [5],  Varvara Lepchenko [26]
 Schedule

Day 2 (25 June)
 Seeds out:
 Gentlemen's Singles:  Philipp Kohlschreiber [16],  Gilles Simon [19],  Sam Querrey [21]
 Ladies' Singles:  Maria Kirilenko [10],  Nadia Petrova [13],  Anastasia Pavlyuchenkova [21],  Tamira Paszek [28],  Romina Oprandi [31]
 Schedule

Day 3 (26 June)
 Seeds out:
 Gentlemen's Singles:  Roger Federer [3],  Jo-Wilfried Tsonga [6],  Marin Čilić [10],  John Isner [18],  Julien Benneteau [31]
 Ladies' Singles:  Victoria Azarenka [2],  Maria Sharapova [3],  Caroline Wozniacki [9],  Ana Ivanovic [12],  Jelena Janković [16],  Sorana Cîrstea [22],  Lucie Šafářová [27]
 Gentlemen's Doubles:  Marcel Granollers /  Marc López [2]
 Schedule

Day 4 (27 June)
 Seeds out:
 Gentlemen's Singles:  Milos Raonic [17]
 Ladies' Singles:  Peng Shuai [24],  Mona Barthel [30]
 Ladies' Doubles:  Anastasia Pavlyuchenkova /  Lucie Šafářová [9],  Chan Hao-ching /  Anabel Medina Garrigues [15]
 Schedule

Day 5 (28 June)
 Seeds out:
 Gentlemen's Singles:  Nicolás Almagro [15],  Grigor Dimitrov [29],  Tommy Robredo [32]
 Ladies' Singles:  Angelique Kerber [7],  Alizé Cornet [29]
 Ladies' Doubles:  Kristina Mladenovic /  Galina Voskoboeva [10],  Daniela Hantuchová /  Maria Kirilenko [14]
 Schedule

Day 6 (29 June)
 Seeds out:
 Gentlemen's Singles:  Richard Gasquet [9],  Kei Nishikori [12],  Juan Mónaco [22],  Benoît Paire [25],  Alexandr Dolgopolov [26],  Kevin Anderson [27],  Jérémy Chardy [28]
 Ladies' Singles:  Samantha Stosur [14],  Dominika Cibulková [18],  Ekaterina Makarova [25],  Klára Zakopalová [32]
 Gentlemen's Doubles:  Santiago González /  Scott Lipsky [10]
 Ladies' Doubles:  Cara Black /  Marina Erakovic [11]
 Schedule

Middle Sunday (30 June)
Following tradition, Middle Sunday is a day of rest, with no matches scheduled.

Day 7 (1 July)
 Seeds out:
 Gentlemen's Singles:  Tommy Haas [13],  Mikhail Youzhny [20],  Andreas Seppi [23]
 Ladies' Singles:  Serena Williams [1],  Roberta Vinci [11],  Carla Suárez Navarro [19]
 Gentlemen's Doubles:  Alexander Peya /  Bruno Soares [3],  Aisam-ul-Haq Qureshi /  Jean-Julien Rojer [5],  Max Mirnyi /  Horia Tecău [7],  Colin Fleming /  Jonathan Marray [9],  Michaël Llodra /  Nicolas Mahut [13],  Łukasz Kubot /  Marcin Matkowski [15],  Treat Huey /  Dominic Inglot [16]
 Ladies' Doubles:  Ekaterina Makarova /  Elena Vesnina [4],  Raquel Kops-Jones /  Abigail Spears [5],  Liezel Huber /  Sania Mirza [6],  Vania King /  Zheng Jie [13]
 Mixed Doubles:  František Čermák /  Lucie Hradecká [12]
 Schedule

Day 8 (2 July)
 Seeds out:
 Ladies' Singles:  Li Na [6],  Petra Kvitová [8],  Sloane Stephens [17]
 Gentlemen's Doubles:  Robert Lindstedt /  Daniel Nestor [6],  Mahesh Bhupathi /  Julian Knowle [8],  Julien Benneteau /  Nenad Zimonjić [11]
 Ladies' Doubles:  Sara Errani /  Roberta Vinci [1]
 Mixed Doubles: Max Mirnyi /  Andrea Hlaváčková [4],  Treat Huey /  Raquel Kops-Jones [9],  Leander Paes /  Zheng Saisai [15],  Ivan Dodig /  Marina Erakovic [16]
 Schedule

Day 9 (3 July)
 Seeds out:
 Gentlemen's Singles:  David Ferrer [4],  Tomáš Berdych [7]
 Ladies' Doubles:  Andrea Hlaváčková /  Lucie Hradecká [2],  Nadia Petrova /  Katarina Srebotnik [3],  Julia Görges /  Barbora Záhlavová-Strýcová [16]
 Mixed Doubles:  Alexander Peya /  Anna-Lena Grönefeld [5],  Marcelo Melo /  Liezel Huber [6],  Aisam-ul-Haq Qureshi /  Cara Black [10],  Scott Lipsky /  Casey Dellacqua [13],  David Marrero /  Kimiko Date-Krumm [14]
 Schedule

Day 10 (4 July)
 Seeds out:
 Ladies' Singles:  Agnieszka Radwańska [4],  Kirsten Flipkens [20]
 Gentlemen's Doubles:  Leander Paes /  Radek Štěpánek [4],  Rohan Bopanna /  Édouard Roger-Vasselin [14]
 Mixed Doubles:  Horia Tecău /  Sania Mirza [2],  Rohan Bopanna /  Zheng Jie [7],  Marcin Matkowski /  Květa Peschke [11]
 Schedule

Day 11 (5 July)
 Seeds out:
 Gentlemen's Singles:  Juan Martín del Potro [8],  Jerzy Janowicz [24]
 Ladies' Doubles:  Anna-Lena Grönefeld /  Květa Peschke [7]
 Mixed Doubles:  Nenad Zimonjić /  Katarina Srebotnik [3]
 Schedule

Day 12 (6 July)
 Seeds out:
 Ladies' Singles:  Sabine Lisicki [23]
 Gentlemen's Doubles:  Ivan Dodig /  Marcelo Melo [12]
 Ladies' Doubles:  Ashleigh Barty /  Casey Dellacqua [12]
 Schedule

Day 13 (7 July)
 Seeds out:
 Gentlemen's Singles:  Novak Djokovic [1]
 Mixed Doubles:  Bruno Soares /  Lisa Raymond [1]
 Schedule

References

Wimbledon Championships by year – Day-by-day summaries